Shell City is a ghost town in section 2 of Shell River Township in Wadena County, Minnesota, United States.

History
The village of Shell City was established by William E. Kindred as the Kindred post office in 1879.  The townsite was then sold to Francis M. Yoder and Sewall Chandler in 1881 and the name was changed to Shell City in 1882.  The town failed to develop as hoped, and the post office was discontinued in 1901.

Notes

Former populated places in Minnesota
Former populated places in Wadena County, Minnesota